Parliamentary elections were held in Vietnam on 19 April 1987, with a second round in eleven constituencies on 3 May. The Vietnamese Fatherland Front was the only party to contest the election, and nominated 829 candidates for the 496 seats. Voter turnout was reported to be 98.8% in the first round.

Results

References

Vietnam
Elections in Vietnam
1987 in Vietnam
One-party elections
Election and referendum articles with incomplete results